Mountain yam may refer to:

 Chinese yam or Dioscorea polystachya
 Japanese mountain yam, which could refer to Dioscorea japonica, or
 , which is a cultivar of D. polystachya